Vyacheslav Serinbayevich Nurmagombetov (born 10 August 1984) is a former Russian professional football player. He also holds Kazakhstani citizenship.

Club career
He played 4 seasons in the Kazakhstan Premier League.

External links
 
 

1984 births
Living people
People from Blagoveshchensk
Russian footballers
Kazakhstani footballers
Association football midfielders
FC Zvezda Irkutsk players
FC Tobol players
FC Zhetysu players
FC Kairat players
FC Novokuznetsk players
Kazakhstan Premier League players
FC Chita players
FC Amur Blagoveshchensk players
Sportspeople from Amur Oblast